Teramo is a city and comune in the Italian region of Abruzzo, the capital of the province of Teramo.

The city,  from Rome, is situated between the highest mountains of  the Apennines (Gran Sasso d'Italia) and the Adriatic coast. The town is located by the confluence of the Vezzola and Tordino rivers,  on a hillside area where the terrain features along with the Mediterranean climate make the territory rich in vineyards and olive groves.

The economy of the town is mostly based on activities connected with agriculture and commerce, as well as a sound industrial sector: textiles, foods, engineering, building materials and ceramics.  Teramo can be reached from the A14 and the A24 motorways.

Climate

The climate is fresh-temperate.  In the coolest month (January) temperatures average , and in the warmest month (July) they average .  In the winter time though they can experience copious amounts of snowfall, as in 2005. The precipitations are not frequent and mostly concentrated in late spring. The summers are characterized by days of somewhat intense heat.

Name 

Interamna (Greek: : Eth. Interamnas, Interamnātis) was the name of several cities in different parts of Italy. Its etymology, already pointed out by Varro and Festus, indicates their position at the confluence of two streams. The form "Interamnium", and the ethnic form Interamnis are also found, but more rarely.  The name referred to the two rivers Vezzola and Tordino, between which it lies.

The name is already defined  in extant manuscripts of the Liber Coloniarum into Teramne, whence its modern form of Teramo. But in the Middle Ages it appears to have been known also by the name of Aprutium, supposed to be a corruption of Praetutium, or rather of the name of the people Praetutii, applied (as was so often the case in Gaul) to their chief city. Thus the name Abrutium is present among the cities of Picenum enumerated by the Geographer of Ravenna (iv. 31); and under the Lombards a comes Aprutii is mentioned. The name has been retained in that of Abruzzo, now a region of Italy.

History

Pre Roman Age
A settlement of the 1st  millennium BC and  some buildings of ancient Italic tribes were the object of archaeological excavations. The most ancient historical remains were found in the outskirts of the city, precisely in the neighborhood Madonna delle grazie, where, among many, a burial place with a dagger and a halberd were found. Allegedly, the development of the old settlement was due to the commercial center founded by the Etruscan civilization.

According to the Roman author Sextus Julius Frontinus, the ancient Perut or Pretut (meaning "Hill surrounded by waters") strongly developed in dimensions and importance until it became the capital of the Praetutii tribe.

Roman age 
In the battle of Sentinum (295 BC), the Romans defied  the Italian confederation (Sabellians, Etrusci, Umbri and their allies the Gauls), starting the Samnite Wars. In 290 BC the Sabine area, along with the Praetutii’s region was occupied by the legions sent by the consul Manius Curius Dentatus. The city took the Latin name of Interamnia Praetuttiorum ("City of the Praetutii between two rivers"). During the reign of Augustus Interamnia is included in the  Picenum district. The area of the current province was  divided from south to north into the  Ager Hatrianus, Ager Praetutianus and Ager Palmense.

After the Second Social War Interamnia became a municipium. The city lost  the status of Municipium because of the participation of Lucius Cornelius Sulla in the Social war (91–88 BC), but the city will subsequently regain it for expressed will of Julius Caesar.

During the Roman age, thanks to its nearness to the capital of the empire, the city lived a  prosperous and favorable moment as proven by the numerous mosaics,  theater, thermal baths and the amphitheater remains. As historians like Ptolemy, Livy and Pliny remember, the city reached its best period under the emperor Hadrian, with the constructions of the temples dedicated to Mars and Apollo.

Middle Ages
Little is known about Teramo in the early Middle Ages, after  first destruction of the city in the year 410 by the Visigoths under Alaric I. The Ostrogoths ruled Interamnia 552–554 AD. Right after the Gothic War (6th century), the city became a Byzantine possession. Teramo was included in the Marchia Firmana, part of the Exarchate of Ravenna. Later it was a Lombard fief and part of the Duchy of Spoleto.

In 1129  the city was conquered by the  Normans, as part of the  County of Apulia. In 1140 it became a  possession of Roger II of Sicily, the first King of Sicily. During the strife following Roger's coronation, Teramo was destroyed by a Norman force under   Robert II of Loritello. Only the tower of Piazza Sant’Anna was saved from this sack; from this moment on it will be called Torre Bruciata (burnt tower). In the 1268 the domination of the House of Hohenstaufen, who had inherited Sicily from Roger II's line, ended; they were replaced by  the House of Anjou.

The ecclesiastical authority of the Aprutina Diocese, led by the bishops Rainaldo Acquaviva, Niccolò degli Arcioni (1317), Stefano da Teramo (1335) and Pietro di Valle (1366) boosted the city's economy, as witnessed by the construction of castles, churches, cloisters and palaces along with the great privileges granted by the sovereigns. Within the following two centuries Teramo became part of the Kingdom of Naples.

Renaissance and modern era 
The 15th century saw the struggles between the most important families of the city (De Valle and Melatino). The exemplary hanging of 13 followers of Melatino's family is still remembered in a stone shield in the very center of the city. The monument represents two heads with their tongues out under the writing “A lo parlare agi mesura” (mind what you say).

During the first years of the century, the tyrant Antonello de Valle was assassinated; his castle, located in what is now Garibaldi Square, was demolished. The legend says that the belligerence between the families ended thanks to the women of the city who proclaimed a strike of affection. Despite the internal struggles, the city lived a very developed cultural period in the century. Artists like Jacobello del Fiore and Nicola da Guardiagrele were called to work in the city, which had  commercial relationship with Tuscany and Venice.

After the death of Ferdinand II, Charles II of Spain sold  Teramo to the Duke of Atri for 40,000 ducats. The people of Teramo rebelled, but with no result. In 1626 Teramo was struck by an earthquake, followed four years later by the plague.  From 1707, after of the War of the Spanish Succession, the Habsburg monarchy rules the whole Kingdom of the Two Sicilies for 27 years. During the Age of Enlightenment Teramo is an active centre of intellectual life, especially with Melchiorre Delfico, a notable poet, composer and Italian philosopher. In 1798 French troops entered Teramo, and though they were initially repulsed by the citizens, they returned a few days later, sacking the whole city.

In 1806 Napoleon defeated the troops of Ferdinand I of the Two Sicilies, and Teramo became a French possession until 1815, when it reverted to the Kingdom of Naples.  King Ferdinand II of the Two Sicilies visited the city in 1832, 1844 and 1847.  In 1890 the Observatory of Collurania was founded.

Contemporary age
In 1925 the first Italian Psychoanalytic Society was founded in Teramo.

During World War II, on  25 June 1943  German troops arrived in Teramo and proceeded to Bosco Martese where they fought against the men of the Resistance movement. The episode is remembered as the "Battle of Bosco Martese".

In 1972 the first edition of Interamnia World Cup was held.

The University of Teramo was founded in the city in 1993.

Main sights 
The city's main attractions include:

the Cathedral of Saint Berardo, built in 1158 by bishop Guido II, in Romanesque style. It has a  portal in Gothic style, finished in 1332 by the Roman master Deodato di Cosma. It houses a  silver antependium by Nicola of Guardiagrele (with 35 scenes of the life of Jesus) and a polyptych by the Venetian artist Jacobello del Fiore depicting the Incoronation of the Virgin. Annexed is a  bell tower.
the Romanesque church of Sant'Antonio (1127), with a decorated portal. The interior, with a single nave, was renovated along Baroque lines.
the church of San Getulio, built in the early Middle Ages on the ruins of a Roman temple, finally destroyed in 1155 by the Normans. Only the presbyterium and some Romanesque elements of the original building remain today.
the church of San Domenico (14th century) with a fine Virgin with Child.
the sanctuary of the Madonna delle Grazie (also known as Chiesa di Santa Maria delle Grazie). It has a  Romanesque cloister and a 15th-century miraculous wooden statue of the Virgin, attributed to Silvestro dell'Aquila.
the Palazzo Vescovile ("Bishops Palace"), from the 14th century.
the remains of the Roman theatre (built about 30 BC) and of the amphitheatre (about 3rd–4th century AD). Under Palazzo Savini are remains of a Roman domus, including a 1st-century BC opus tessellatum pavement which depicts a fighting lion and other decorative elements.
the Torre Bruciata ("Burnt Tower"), a Roman tower from the 2nd century BC, in opus quadratum. The name derives from the traces left by the siege in 1156 by Robert III of Loritello.
Church of Santa Maria de Praediis (10th–11th centuries), built using materials from the destroyed castle and Roman villas and temples.

Culture 

An art exhibit, Maggio Festeggiante, is held each May.  The summer calendar includes the Teramo Literary Prize and the Interamnia World Cup, an international handball event.  A week in October is also dedicated to an international photography of film show.

University of Teramo 

The University of Teramo offers 5 faculties, 24 bachelor's degree courses, 35 master's, 6 postgraduate schools and 10 departments. The Coste Sant'Agostino Campus holds the faculties of Law, Communication Sciences, and Political Science. The University is going through a period of internationalization by offering scholarships to students from all over of the world.

Osservatorio Collurania
The Observatory of Teramo was founded by Vincenzo Cerulli in 1890–1891, and donated to the Italian administration in 1891. Starting from 1994, the observatory owns an  optical telescope.

Government 

At the municipal level, the City of Teramo has a council made up of the mayor and councilmen that are elected every 5 years. in Italy every citizen over 18 has the right to vote.

Twin towns — sister cities

Teramo is twinned with:

 Berane, Montenegro, since 1982
 Memmingen, Germany, since 1986
 Rishon LeZion, Israel, since 1988
 Prague 7, Czech Republic, since 2005
 Ribeirão Preto, Brazil, since 2005
 Gorzów Wielkopolski, Poland, since 2007
 Ávila, Spain, since 2010
 Strovolos, Cyprus, since 2010
 Aglandjia, Cyprus, since 2011

Notable people 
People born in or around Teramo include:
 Berardo da Pagliara, (?-1123), bishop and patron saint of the city and diocese
 Melchiorre Delfico, (1744–1835), Enlightenment philosopher
 Melchiorre Delfico, (1825–1895), caricaturist
 Vincenzo Cerulli (1859–1927), astronomer
 Ivan Graziani, (1945–1997), singer-songwriter
 Marco Pannella (1930–2016), politician
 Francesco Possenti, (1838–1861), also known as Saint Gabriel of Our Lady of Sorrows.   Patron saint of Abruzzo
 Felice Centofanti, (1969–present), a former soccer player
 Marco Mordente, (1979–present), Basketball player
 Gianni Di Venanzo, (1920–1966), cinematographer
 Gaia Sabbatini (born 1999), Italian middle-distance runner

Neighborhoods 
 Il Castello
 Colleparco
 Gammarana
 Madonna della Cona
 San Berardo
 San Benedetto
 San Leonardo
 Santa Maria a Bitetto
 Santo Spirito
 Villa Mosca
 Villa Pavone
 Piano della Lenta
 Colleatterrato

Frazioni 
Frazioni within the commune of Teramo include:

 Cannelli
 Caprafico
 Castagneto
 Castrogno
 Cavuccio
 Cerreto
 Chiareto
 Colle Caruno
 Colleatterrato Alto
 Colleminuccio
 Colle Santa Maria
 Forcella 
 Frondarola
 Galeotti
 Garrano
 Garrano Basso
 Magnanella
 Miano
 Monticelli
 Nepezzano
 Pantaneto
 Poggio Cono
 Piano D'Accio
 Piano della Lenta
 Poggio San Vittorino
 Ponzano
 Putignano
 Rapino
 Rocciano
 Rupo
 Sardinara
 Saccoccia
 San Nicolò a Tordino
 San Pietro ad Lacum
 Sant'Atto
 Santa Reparata
 Scapriano
 Sciusciano
 Sorrenti
 Spiano
 Tofo Sant'Eleuterio
 Tordinia
 Turri
 Valle Pezzata
 Valle San Giovanni
 Valle Soprana
 Varano
 Villa Falchini
 Villa Gesso
 Villa Ripa
 Villa Romita
 Villa Stanghieri
 Villa Taraschi
 Villa Viola
 Villa Vomano

Sport

Basketball
Teramo Basket was a basketball team playing in Serie A, the Italian professional basketball league. They finished third in the league in 2009 which qualified them for the Eurocup in 2010. Italian and American players have appeared with the team, including Bobby Jones, Clay Tucker, Jaycee Carroll, Roger Powell, and Hassan Adams. They dissolved in 2012 due to financial issues.

Football
Teramo Calcio was founded on 15 July 1913.

The "Gaetano Bonolis" stadium hosts concerts and football matches. It has a capacity of 8,000.

Handball

HC Teramo 2002 team won the Italian top league in 2012 in handball. The club also has a counterpart men's team.

Every July, the city hosts the Interamnia World Cup, an international handball tournament with teams from all over the world.

Other sports
Other sports practiced in Teramo are: tennis (the city hosts an international tournament once a year), rugby, water polo and rallying with Rally of Teramo. The Maratonina pretuziana short marathon is celebrated every year.

Teramo torball is the team that has won the most titles in Italy; it has also won a Champion's league.

Gastronomy 

The provincial Teramo gastronomy is known for its variety and richness.  Typical ingredients include agnello (lamb), peperoncino (hot pepper), formaggio pecorino (sheep milk cheeses), and slow roasted pork. Common wines are the renowned Montepulciano and Trebbiano d'Abruzzo.

Typical dishes from Teramo and the surrounding communities include the following:
 scrippelle – This dish is served in the throughout the Teramo province and is somewhat similar to French crêpes, although typically made without milk. There are two common variations. The first is scrippelle 'mbusse – (dialect for scrippelle in brodo or broth) and consists of scrippelle rolled up in Pecorino or Parmesan cheese and served in chicken broth.  A second variation is timballo – scrippelle layered with ragù, meat or tiny meatballs (polpettini), various cheeses such as scamorza, and sometimes peas (piselli).
 maccheroni alla chitarra – a flat, stringlike egg pasta which takes its name from the wooden instrument, basically a wooden frame strung with fine metal wire, called a chitarra (guitar), used to cut the pasta.
 mazzarelle – lamb's lung and innards wrapped in beet greens or chard and braised in white wine or tomato sauce. Not for the faint of heart and not to be confused with mozzarella cheese.
 virtù – a vegetable soup typically prepared in May of each year to celebrate spiritual redemption and the bountiful virtues of the Earth.  It is made with a wide variety of locally grown vegetables and  typically includes "annit" (a type of wild fennel).
 tacchino alla canzanese – a dish famous in the nearby provincial town of Canzano.  Made by slow baking a turkey in gelatin (an ancient method of preserving meat) and typically served cold.
 vino cotto – a fortified wine, found also in the Marche region, produced by slowly boiling down grape juice before fermentation and aging thus producing a sweet and rich dessert-type of wine.  Consumed both straight up and in cooking.
 caggiunitti – deep fried almond fritters typically made with chocolate and chestnuts.

Teramo is also home to Torrefazione Adriatica, S.p.A., founded in 1942 and manufacturer of Marcafe, one of the most important brands of coffee in Italy.

Transportation

By railways, Teramo is connected with Pescara.

The nearest airport is the “Abruzzo Airport”.

See also 
Colle Caruno
Museo Civico di Teramo
Museo archeologico Francesco Savini

References 

 
Cities and towns in Abruzzo